Laura Andrea del Colle is an Argentine field hockey player. At the 2012 Summer Olympics, she competed for the Argentina women's national field hockey team in the women's event and won the silver medal. Laura has also won the Champions Trophy in 2012.

References

External links 
 

1983 births
Living people
Argentine female field hockey players
Female field hockey goalkeepers
Olympic field hockey players of Argentina
Field hockey players at the 2012 Summer Olympics
Olympic medalists in field hockey
Las Leonas players
Olympic silver medalists for Argentina
Medalists at the 2012 Summer Olympics
Sportspeople from Rosario, Santa Fe